Sylvain Deplace (born 4 January 1972 in Lyon) is a French former professional footballer who played as a midfielder.

External links

Living people
1972 births
Footballers from Lyon
Association football midfielders
French footballers
France under-21 international footballers
Ligue 1 players
Ligue 2 players
Olympique Lyonnais players
Montpellier HSC players
En Avant Guingamp players
FC Martigues players